A2S is used as an abbreviation for

 Amazon Associates Web Service, now known as Amazon Product Advertising API
 Assist-2-Sell